The 2008–09 New Jersey Nets season was the 42nd season of the franchise, and their 33rd in the National Basketball Association (NBA).

Key dates
 June 26: The 2008 NBA draft took place in New York City.
 July 1: The free agency period started.

Offseason
On June 26, it was announced the Nets had officially traded Richard Jefferson in exchange for Milwaukee Bucks players Yi Jianlian and Bobby Simmons. After missing the playoffs last season and going no further than the Eastern Conference Semi-finals the past five years, the Nets needed to change. Jefferson left after seven years at New Jersey where he ended up as the Nets third all-time leading scorer in franchise history. On July 21, the Nets acquired Orlando Magic guard Keyon Dooling in exchange for cash considerations.

Draft picks

Roster

Regular season

Standings

Record vs. opponents

Game log

|- bgcolor="#bbffbb"
| 1
| October 29
| @ Washington
| 
| Vince Carter (21)
| Brook Lopez (8)
| Vince Carter (6)
| Verizon Center20,173
| 1–0

|- bgcolor="#ffcccc"
| 2
| November 1
| Golden State
| 
| Vince Carter (20)
| Josh Boone (14)
| Keyon Dooling (6)
| Izod Center17,390
| 1–1
|- bgcolor="#ffcccc"
| 3
| November 4
| Phoenix
| 
| Vince Carter (19)
| Yi Jianlian (8)
| Devin Harris (7)
| Izod Center15,230
| 1–2
|- bgcolor="#bbffbb"
| 4
| November 7
| Detroit
| 
| Devin Harris (38)
| Josh Boone (14)
| Vince Carter (7)
| Izod Center17,767
| 2–2
|- bgcolor="#ffcccc"
| 5
| November 8
| @ Indiana
| 
| Vince Carter (31)
| Yi Jianlian (11)
| Keyon Dooling (4)
| Conseco Fieldhouse14,355
| 2–3
|- bgcolor="#ffcccc"
| 6
| November 10
| @ Miami
| 
| Yi Jianlian (24)
| Yi Jianlian (10)
| Yi Jianlian, Vince Carter, Keyon Dooling (4)
| American Airlines Arena15,028
| 2–4
|- bgcolor="#ffcccc"
| 7
| November 12
| Indiana
| 
| Vince Carter (28)
| Yi Jianlian (8)
| Vince Carter (7)
| Izod Center13,551
| 2–5
|- bgcolor="#bbffbb"
| 8
| November 14
| Atlanta
| 
| Devin Harris (30)
| Brook Lopez (9)
| Devin Harris (8)
| Izod Center15,309
| 3–5
|- bgcolor="#bbffbb"
| 9
| November 15
| @ Atlanta
| 
| Devin Harris (33)
| Brook Lopez (7)
| Devin Harris (10)
| Philips Arena18,729
| 4–5
|- bgcolor="#ffcccc"
| 10
| November 18
| Cleveland
| 
| Devin Harris (23)
| Brook Lopez (13)
| Vince Carter (6)
| Izod Center16,911
| 4–6
|- bgcolor="#bbffbb"
| 11
| November 21
| @ Toronto
| 
| Vince Carter (39)
| Vince Carter (9)
| Vince Carter (6)
| Air Canada Centre19,800
| 5–6
|- bgcolor="#bbffbb"
| 12
| November 22
| L.A. Clippers
| 
| Yi Jianlian (27)
| Brook Lopez (10)
| Devin Harris (10)
| Izod Center17,677
| 6–6
|- bgcolor="#ffcccc"
| 13
| November 25
| @ L.A. Lakers
| 
| Devin Harris (21)
| Brook Lopez (10)
| Devin Harris (6)
| Staples Center18,997
| 6–7
|- bgcolor="#bbffbb"
| 14
| November 26
| @ Sacramento
| 
| Vince Carter (25)
| Brook Lopez, Ryan Anderson (8)
| Devin Harris (7)
| ARCO Arena11,650
| 7–7
|- bgcolor="#bbffbb"
| 15
| November 29
| @ Utah
| 
| Devin Harris (34)
| Brook Lopez (8)
| Devin Harris (6)
| EnergySolutions Arena19,911
| 8–7
|- bgcolor="#bbffbb"
| 16
| November 30
| @ Phoenix
| 
| Devin Harris (47)
| Devin Harris, Brook Lopez (7)
| Devin Harris (8)
| US Airways Center18,422
| 9–7

|- bgcolor="#ffcccc"
| 17
| December 2
| Washington
| 
| Devin Harris (18)
| Brook Lopez (9)
| Chris Douglas-Roberts, Yi Jianlian, Devin Harris, Vince Carter, Keyon Dooling (2)
| Izod Center15,062
| 9–8
|- bgcolor="#bbffbb"
| 18
| December 5
| Minnesota
| 
| Vince Carter (18)
| Brook Lopez (10)
| Devin Harris (5)
| Izod Center15,364
| 10–8
|- bgcolor="#bbffbb"
| 19
| December 6
| @ Philadelphia
| 
| Devin Harris (27)
| Vince Carter, Brook Lopez (11)
| Devin Harris, Vince Carter (8)
| Wachovia Center13,096
| 11–8
|- bgcolor="#ffcccc"
| 20
| December 10
| New York
| 
| Devin Harris (32)
| Vince Carter (7)
| Devin Harris (7)
| Izod Center16,722
| 11–9
|- bgcolor="#ffcccc"
| 21
| December 12
| Toronto
| 
| Yi Jianlian, Devin Harris (14)
| Brook Lopez (8)
| Devin Harris (5)
| Izod Center13,926
| 11–10
|- bgcolor="#ffcccc"
| 22
| December 13
| @ Chicago
| 
| Vince Carter (39)
| Bobby Simmons (10)
| Devin Harris (7)
| United Center21,751
| 11–11
|- bgcolor="#bbffbb"
| 23
| December 15
| @ Toronto
| 
| Ryan Anderson (21)
| Vince Carter (10)
| Vince Carter, Devin Harris (5)
| Air Canada Centre18,561
| 12–11
|- bgcolor="#ffcccc"
| 24
| December 17
| Utah
| 
| Vince Carter (32)
| Yi Jianlian, Brook Lopez (7)
| Devin Harris (11)
| Izod Center12,542
| 12–12
|- bgcolor="#bbffbb"
| 25
| December 19
| Dallas
| 
| Devin Harris (41)
| Vince Carter, Yi Jianlian (10)
| Devin Harris (13)
| Izod Center9,889
| 13–12
|- bgcolor="#ffcccc"
| 26
| December 20
| Miami
| 
| Brook Lopez (22)
| Brook Lopez (13)
| Devin Harris (9)
| Izod Center14,139
| 13–13
|- bgcolor="#ffcccc"
| 27
| December 22
| Houston
| 
| Keyon Dooling (17)
| Brook Lopez (9)
| Keyon Dooling (5)
| Izod Center16,303
| 13–14
|- bgcolor="#bbffbb"
| 28
| December 23
| @ Indiana
| 
| Vince Carter (38)
| Vince Carter, Brook Lopez (8)
| Devin Harris (11)
| Conseco Fieldhouse11,272
| 14–14
|- bgcolor="#ffcccc"
| 29
| December 26
| Charlotte
| 
| Vince Carter (19)
| Brook Lopez (7)
| Keyon Dooling (6)
| Izod Center16,852
| 14–15
|- bgcolor="#bbffbb"
| 30
| December 27
| @ Charlotte
| 
| Vince Carter (28)
| Brook Lopez (13)
| Vince Carter, Keyon Dooling (6)
| Time Warner Cable Arena15,837
| 15–15
|- bgcolor="#ffcccc"
| 31
| December 29
| Chicago
| 
| Vince Carter (31)
| Bobby Simmons (10)
| Devin Harris, Bobby Simmons (5)
| Izod Center18,786
| 15–16
|- bgcolor="#ffcccc"
| 32
| December 31
| @ Detroit
| 
| Brook Lopez (23)
| Brook Lopez (12)
| Devin Harris (9)
| The Palace of Auburn Hills22,076
| 15–17

|- bgcolor="#bbffbb"
| 33
| January 2
| Atlanta
| 
| Devin Harris (26)
| Brook Lopez (11)
| Devin Harris (11)
| Izod Center16,851
| 16–17
|- bgcolor="#ffcccc"
| 34
| January 3
| @ Miami
| 
| Keyon Dooling (23)
| Vince Carter, Bobby Simmons (9)
| Keyon Dooling (7)
| American Airlines Arena19,600
| 16–18
|- bgcolor="#bbffbb"
| 35
| January 5
| Sacramento
| 
| Vince Carter (29)
| Yi Jianlian (13)
| Vince Carter, Devin Harris (7)
| Izod Center12,314
| 17–18
|- bgcolor="#bbffbb"
| 36
| January 7
| Memphis
| 
| Vince Carter (25)
| Jarvis Hayes, Brook Lopez (8)
| Vince Carter (12)
| Izod Center11,552
| 18–18
|- bgcolor="#ffcccc"
| 37
| January 9
| @ Milwaukee
| 
| Vince Carter (23)
| Vince Carter (9)
| Vince Carter (14)
| Bradley Center15,768
| 18–19
|- bgcolor="#bbffbb"
| 38
| January 12
| Oklahoma City
| 
| Brook Lopez (31)
| Brook Lopez (13)
| Devin Harris (8)
| Izod Center12,972
| 19–19
|- bgcolor="#ffcccc"
| 39
| January 14
| @ Boston
| 
| Devin Harris (17)
| Brook Lopez (8)
| Devin Harris (3)
| TD Banknorth Garden18,624
| 19–20
|- bgcolor="#ffcccc"
| 40
| January 15
| Portland
| 
| Devin Harris (23)
| Vince Carter (9)
| Devin Harris (8)
| Izod Center13,824
| 19–21
|- bgcolor="#ffcccc"
| 41
| January 17
| Boston
| 
| Brook Lopez (28)
| Brook Lopez (10)
| Keyon Dooling (8)
| Izod Center17,578
| 19–22
|- bgcolor="#ffcccc"
| 42
| January 21
| @ New Orleans
| 
| Vince Carter (20)
| Ryan Anderson (10)
| Keyon Dooling, Devin Harris (6)
| New Orleans Arena14,748
| 19–23
|- bgcolor="#ffcccc"
| 43
| January 23
| @ San Antonio
| 
| Devin Harris (27)
| Brook Lopez (8)
| Vince Carter (6)
| AT&T Center18,797
| 19–24
|- bgcolor="#bbffbb"
| 44
| January 24
| @ Memphis
| 
| Vince Carter (23)
| Ryan Anderson (9)
| Devin Harris (8)
| FedExForum12,817
| 20–24
|- bgcolor="#ffcccc"
| 45
| January 26
| @ Oklahoma City
| 
| Brook Lopez (18)
| Brook Lopez (7)
| Devin Harris, Keyon Dooling (6)
| Ford Center18,264
| 20–25
|- bgcolor="#ffcccc"
| 46
| January 28
| Toronto
| 
| Vince Carter (27)
| Vince Carter (10)
| Devin Harris (10)
| Izod Center10,138
| 20–26
|- bgcolor="#ffcccc"
| 47
| January 30
| @ Atlanta
| 
| Devin Harris (20)
| Jarvis Hayes (7)
| Devin Harris (6)
| Philips Arena17,561
| 20–27
|- bgcolor="#bbffbb"
| 48
| January 31
| @ Philadelphia
| 
| Brook Lopez (24)
| Brook Lopez (17)
| Devin Harris (6)
| Wachovia Center17,783
| 21–27

|- bgcolor="#bbffbb"
| 49
| February 3
| Milwaukee
| 
| Brook Lopez (22)
| Brook Lopez (12)
| Vince Carter (12)
| Izod Center10,102
| 22–27
|- bgcolor="#bbffbb"
| 50
| February 4
| @ Washington
| 
| Devin Harris (26)
| Brook Lopez (12)
| Devin Harris (7)
| Verizon Center12,602
| 23–27
|- bgcolor="#bbffbb"
| 51
| February 7
| Denver
| 
| Devin Harris (28)
| Ryan Anderson (12)
| Vince Carter (8)
| Izod Center17,697
| 24–27
|- bgcolor="#ffcccc"
| 52
| February 8
| @ Orlando
| 
| Devin Harris (28)
| Brook Lopez (12)
| Devin Harris (12)
| Amway Arena16,533
| 24–28
|- bgcolor="#ffcccc"
| 53
| February 10
| San Antonio
| 
| Vince Carter (25)
| Devin Harris (7)
| Vince Carter, Devin Harris (5)
| Izod Center13,301
| 24–29
|- bgcolor="#ffcccc"
| 54
| February 17
| @ Houston
| 
| Vince Carter (30)
| Brook Lopez (9)
| Chris Douglas-Roberts, Devin Harris (4)
| Toyota Center14,921
| 24–30
|- bgcolor="#ffcccc"
| 55
| February 18
| @ Dallas
| 
| Devin Harris (18)
| Brook Lopez (7)
| Devin Harris (7)
| American Airlines Center19,878
| 24–31
|- bgcolor="#ffcccc"
| 56
| February 20
| Washington
| 
| Devin Harris (26)
| Ryan Anderson (9)
| Devin Harris (10)
| Izod Center15,113
| 24–32
|- bgcolor="#bbffbb"
| 57
| February 23
| Philadelphia
| 
| Devin Harris (39)
| Yi Jianlian (6)
| Devin Harris (8)
| Izod Center13,236
| 25–32
|- bgcolor="#bbffbb"
| 58
| February 25
| Chicago
| 
| Devin Harris (42)
| Vince Carter, Yi Jianlian (9)
| Vince Carter (7)
| Izod Center14,075
| 26–32

|- bgcolor="#ffcccc"
| 59
| March 1
| New Orleans
| 
| Vince Carter, Devin Harris (26)
| Brook Lopez (12)
| Devin Harris (14)
| Izod Center15,509
| 26–33
|- bgcolor="#bbffbb"
| 60
| March 3
| @ Milwaukee
| 
| Brook Lopez (24)
| Brook Lopez (12)
| Devin Harris (11)
| Bradley Center13,967
| 27–33
|- bgcolor="#ffcccc"
| 61
| March 4
| Boston
| 
| Vince Carter (34)
| Brook Lopez (5)
| Devin Harris (11)
| Izod Center15,791
| 27–34
|- bgcolor="#ffcccc"
| 62
| March 6
| @ Orlando
| 
| Devin Harris (25)
| Jarvis Hayes, Brook Lopez, Yi Jianlian (6)
| Devin Harris (9)
| Amway Arena17,461
| 27–35
|- bgcolor="#bbffbb"
| 63
| March 8
| New York
| 
| Devin Harris (35)
| Vince Carter (9)
| Devin Harris (10)
| Izod Center18,846
| 28–35
|- bgcolor="#ffcccc"
| 64
| March 11
| @ Golden State
| 
| Devin Harris (31)
| Devin Harris (7)
| Devin Harris (12)
| Oracle Arena18,203
| 28–36
|- bgcolor="#ffcccc"
| 65
| March 13
| @ Portland
| 
| Devin Harris (27)
| Devin Harris (7)
| Devin Harris (8)
| Rose Garden20,634
| 28–37
|- bgcolor="#ffcccc"
| 66
| March 15
| @ L.A. Clippers
| 
| Vince Carter (41)
| Vince Carter, Trenton Hassell (7)
| Vince Carter (6)
| Staples Center18,266
| 28–38
|- bgcolor="#ffcccc"
| 67
| March 16
| @ Denver
| 
| Vince Carter (32)
| Brook Lopez (6)
| Keyon Dooling (6)
| Pepsi Center16,223
| 28–39
|- bgcolor="#bbffbb"
| 68
| March 18
| @ New York
| 
| Vince Carter (29)
| Trenton Hassell (9)
| Brook Lopez, Keyon Dooling (8)
| Madison Square Garden19,763
| 29–39
|- bgcolor="#bbffbb"
| 69
| March 20
| Miami
| 
| Jarvis Hayes, Chris Douglas-Roberts (18)
| Vince Carter (9)
| Vince Carter, Keyon Dooling (8)
| Izod Center18,108
| 30–39
|- bgcolor="#ffcccc"
| 70
| March 22
| Cleveland
| 
| Vince Carter (25)
| Vince Carter (9)
| Vince Carter (5)
| Izod Center18,348
| 30–40
|- bgcolor="#ffcccc"
| 71
| March 25
| @ Cleveland
| 
| Vince Carter (20)
| Brook Lopez (10)
| Keyon Dooling (10)
| Quicken Loans Arena20,562
| 30–41
|- bgcolor="#ffcccc"
| 72
| March 27
| L.A. Lakers
| 
| Vince Carter (20)
| Brook Lopez (10)
| Devin Harris (14)
| Izod Center19,990
| 30–42
|- bgcolor="#ffcccc"
| 73
| March 29
| @ Minnesota
| 
| Vince Carter (36)
| Brook Lopez (9)
| Devin Harris (5)
| Target Center16,539
| 30–43
|- bgcolor="#ffcccc"
| 74
| March 30
| Milwaukee
| 
| Chris Douglas-Roberts (14)
| Brook Lopez (10)
| Chris Douglas-Roberts (4)
| Izod Center12,205
| 30–44

|- bgcolor="#bbffbb"
| 75
| April 1
| Detroit
| 
| Keyon Dooling (23)
| Brook Lopez, Vince Carter, Josh Boone (7)
| Devin Harris (11)
| Izod Center15,105
| 31–44
|- bgcolor="#ffcccc"
| 76
| April 4
| @ Chicago
| 
| Brook Lopez (20)
| Brook Lopez, Ryan Anderson (10)
| Keyon Dooling (8)
| United Center21,424
| 31–45
|- bgcolor="#bbffbb"
| 77
| April 5
| Philadelphia
| 
| Vince Carter (15)
| Brook Lopez (8)
| Devin Harris (7)
| Izod Center13,345
| 32–45
|- bgcolor="#ffcccc"
| 78
| April 8
| @ Boston
| 
| Vince Carter (33)
| Vince Carter (12)
| Keyon Dooling (6)
| TD Banknorth Garden18,624
| 32–46
|- bgcolor="#ffcccc"
| 79
| April 10
| @ Detroit
| 
| Ryan Anderson (20)
| Brook Lopez (7)
| Vince Carter (10)
| The Palace of Auburn Hills22,076
| 32–47
|- bgcolor="#bbffbb"
| 80
| April 11
| Orlando
| 
| Vince Carter (27)
| Brook Lopez (11)
| Keyon Dooling (10)
| Izod Center17,123
| 33–47
|- bgcolor="#bbffbb"
| 81
| April 13
| Charlotte
| 
| Brook Lopez (18)
| Brook Lopez (20)
| Vince Carter (5)
| Izod Center14,519
| 34–47
|-bgcolor="#ffcccc"
| 82
| April 15
| @ New York
| 
| Chris Douglas-Roberts (18)
| Brook Lopez (11)
| Keyon Dooling (5)
| Madison Square Garden19,763
| 34–48

Player statistics

Season

| 
| 20 || 0 || 4.9 || .349 || .000 || .500 || 0.5 || 0.2 || 0.05 || 0.10 || 1.7
|-
| 
| 66 || 30 || 19.9 || .393 || .365 || style=";"|.845 || 4.7 || 0.8 || 0.67 || 0.30 || 7.4
|-
| 
| 62 || 7 || 16.0 || .528 || .000 || .376 || 4.2 || 0.5 || 0.35 || 0.77 || 4.2
|-
| 
| 80 || style=";"|80 || style=";"|36.8 || .437 || .385 || .817 || 5.1 || 4.7 || 1.03 || 0.48 || 20.8
|-
| 
| 77 || 18 || 26.9 || .436 || .421 || .825 || 2.0 || 3.5 || 0.92 || 0.10 || 9.7
|-
| 
| 44 || 3 || 13.3 || .460 || .250 || .823 || 1.1 || 1.2 || 0.27 || 0.16 || 4.9
|-
| 
| 69 || 69 || 36.1 || .438 || .291 || .820 || 3.3 || style=";"|6.9 || style=";"|1.65 || 0.19 || style=";"|21.3
|-
| 
| 53 || 31 || 20.6 || .450 || .250 || .800 || 2.8 || 1.0 || 0.40 || 0.30 || 3.7
|-
| 
| 74 || 1 || 24.8 || .445 || .385 || .692 || 3.6 || 0.7 || 0.70 || 0.09 || 8.7
|-
| 
| style=";"|82 || 75 || 30.5 || .531 || .000 || .793 || style=";"|8.1 || 1.0 || 0.54 || style=";"|1.84 || 13.0
|-
| 
| 27 || 0 || 11.8 || .446 || .200 || .364 || 2.5 || 0.7 || 0.37 || 0.15 || 2.9
|-
| 
| 71 || 44 || 24.4 || .449 || style=";"|.447 || .741 || 3.9 || 1.3 || 0.70 || 0.14 || 7.8
|-
| 
| 6 || 0 || 10.7 || style=";"|.600 || .000 || .455 || 2.2 || 0.2 || 0.00 || 0.33 || 3.8
|-
| 
| 33 || 0 || 11.1 || .417 || .000 || .625 || 2.4 || 0.4 || 0.21 || 0.88 || 2.4
|-
| 
| 61 || 52 || 23.3 || .382 || .343 || .772 || 5.3 || 1.0 || 0.48 || 0.59 || 8.6
|}
*Statistics with the New Jersey Nets

Awards and records

Awards

Records

Transactions

Trades

Additions

Subtractions

References

New Jersey Nets season
New Jersey Nets seasons
New Jersey Nets
New Jersey Nets
21st century in East Rutherford, New Jersey
Meadowlands Sports Complex